Clement Cruttwell (1743 – 5 August 1808) was an English compiler of religious works and gazetteers.

Biography

Cruttwell was born at Wokingham, Berkshire in 1743. He enrolled at St Mary Hall, Oxford on 14 December 1780. He commenced his career as a surgeon at Bath, where he published his ‘Advice to Lying-in Women’ in 1779. He soon afterwards took orders. He published Bishop Thomas Wilson's Bible and an autobiography in 1785. He then began his ‘Concordance of the Parallel Texts of Scripture’ (1790), which he printed in his own house, and on its completion his health was so broken down that he went to the baths of Saint-Amand for a cure. His ‘Gazetteer of France’ (1793) and ‘Gazetteer of the Netherlands’ (1794) were succeeded by his ‘Universal Gazetteer’ (1798), an enormous compilation, of which the entire edition was quickly sold out. He was engaged on a second edition of this great work, which was to contain thirty thousand fresh articles, when he died suddenly while on the way to his native town, at Froxfield in Wiltshire, on 5 August 1808.

Works
   
 v.1. (A-Fus); v.2; v.3 (Q-Z)

References

Attribution

External links

1743 births
1808 deaths
18th-century English people
People from Wokingham